"Sich a Getting Up Stairs" (and various variant spellings) is an American song that dates to the early 1830s. It was in the repertoire of Thomas D. Rice and other early blackface performers.

Musicologist Hans Nathan calls "Sich a Getting Up Stairs" a descendant of the song "Getting Upstairs", a Border Morris song from England and Wales. Musicologist Dale Cockrell, on the other hand, doubts this, as the copy of "Getting Upstairs" on which Nathan based his comparison dates to after the creation of the American blackface song. "Sich a Getting Up Stairs" was fairly popular in the United States and could thus have influenced later versions of the Morris song.

Notes

References

Cockrell, Dale (1997). Demons of Disorder: Early Blackface Minstrels and Their World. Cambridge University Press.
Nathan, Hans (1962). Dan Emmett and the Rise of Early Negro Minstrelsy. Norman: University of Oklahoma Press.

External links
 "Gettin' Upstairs" at the Bluegrass Messengers website

Blackface minstrel songs
1830s songs